Telegraph is a settlement on St Mary's, the largest of the Isles of Scilly, England.

This elevation made it (and continues to make it) an ideal spot for communications (transmitting within the islands and with the British mainland too). The settlement takes its name from Telegraph Tower, situated at the summit of the hill.

History of telegraph communication to Scilly
In the late 1860s, Mr. Buxton of Scilly attempted to persuade the Post Office to install a telegraph cable to the Isles of Scilly. However, the Post Office declined and it was decided that a private company should undertake the project. Ashurst, Morris and Company of Old Jewry, London were contracted by the Scilly Islands Telegraph Company. They entered into a contract with Mr. Fenwick of Gateshead (who had been responsible for the first submarine cable between Dover and Calais which was completed on 25 September 1851). The core of the Scilly cable consisted of three copper wires, insulated by india-rubber, and was manufactured by the Silvertown Company. The outer covering was composed of six strands of Manilla hemp, through each of which ran a galvanised iron wire.

On 22 September 1869 the steamer Resolute of Newcastle, arrived at Penzance with the telegraph cable to connect Land’s End to the Isles of Scilly. Rockets were used to convey a rope ashore, and the cable on the ship attached to this rope, and hauled ashore to make the land connection at Zawn Reeth. Cable laying was completed by Sunday 26 September 1869 when the cable reached Deep Point, beneath the high lands of Normandy on St Mary’s.

The cable broke in mid 1870 and had to be repaired. The cost of sending a 20 word message from Penzance to the Isles of Scilly was 2s 6d. A second cable, manufactured by the Telegraph Construction and Maintenance Company was laid in 1870 allowing messages to be sent or received from any Postal Telegraph Office in the United Kingdom. The cost of sending a 20 word message using this system was an additional 1s per message on top of the Scilly Islands Telegraph Company charge of 2s 6d. On 28 June 1870 a branch was opened to Tresco.

The cable was used initially for shipowners and merchants to communicate with their vessels moored in the Islands, and was also used to send weather observations to the mainland.

The cable service failed in 1876 and the Scilly Islands Telegraph Company did not have the resources to repair it. Eventually the Post Office agreed to purchase and repair it and they took over the assets of the Scilly company on 24 April 1879. The cost of messages was reduced to 1s for the first 20 words, and then 3d for every additional 5 words.

Current use
The only golf club on the Isles of Scilly is situated between Telegraph and the coast to the west. The course consists of nine holes, each with two tees. The club was founded in 1904 and is open to visitors.

HM Coastguard had a station at Telegraph until 2017.

McFarland's Down is a linear settlement that grew in the latter half of the 20th century and is to the immediate north of Telegraph.

References

Villages in the Isles of Scilly
Populated places on St Mary's, Isles of Scilly